Bilge Tarhan (born 20 May 2004) is a Turkish artistic gymnast. She competed at the 2020 European Women's Artistic Gymnastics Championships in Mersin, Turkey.

Her brother Bora Tarhan is also an artistic gymnast.

Tarhan competed at the 2018 Junior Mediterranean Championships in Tunis, Tunisa and won bronze medals in the Vault and Balance beam events. The same year, she took gold medals in the Vault and Balance beam events, the bronze medal in the Uneven bars event and the gold medal in the Individual all-around at the 2018 Barborka Cup in Zabrze, Poland. At the 2019 Stella Zakharova Cup in Kyiv, Ukraine, she won silver medals in the Balance beam and with her team mates in the Juniors division. She took the silver medal with her team mates at the 2019 Mediterranean Championships held in Cagliari, Italy.

References

External links
 

2004 births
Living people
Sportspeople from Bolu
Turkish female artistic gymnasts
Gymnasts at the 2022 Mediterranean Games
Mediterranean Games competitors for Turkey
21st-century Turkish women